Oliver James Sherwood  (born May 23, 1955) is a National Hunt trainer.

Background
Sherwood’s parents – Nat and Heather Sherwood – were both talented point-to-point horse riders.  They each won many races during the 1950s and 1960s.  Sherwood’s younger brother Simon also showed a great love for horses and was a successful jockey famously winning the Cheltenham Gold Cup on Desert Orchid in 1989.

Career highlights
Sherwood began training in 1984.  Since that time he has sent out more than 800 winners.  Some of the most famous horses he has trained over the years include: Arctic Call, Be Rude Not To, Claymore, Coulton, Cruising Altitude, Eric’s Charm, Him Of Praise, Hulysse Royal, Jaunty Flight, Large Action, Lord Of The River, Manorson, Mischievous Milly, Monkerhostin, Puffin Billy, Tildarg, The Breener, The West Awake and Young Snugfit.

In 1979-80 Sherwood became the Champion Amateur Jockey in the National Hunt season.  He won at the Cheltenham Festival on three separate occasions: Sun Alliance Novices Hurdle 1979 (with Venture to Cognac), Christie’s Foxhunters' Chase 1980 (with Rolls Rambler) and 1984 (with Venture to Cognac). Festival victories include: Aldino, Coulton, Rebel Song, The West Awake and Young Pokey.

Sherwood has trained four of the Mares Final (Newbury) winners: Atrabates (1986), Northern Jinx (1989), Jaunty Flight (2008) and Argento Luna (2009).  He has also won the Challow Hurdle three times, the Sun Alliance Novice Hurdle twice, the Bula Hurdle three times, the Scottish Champion Hurdle, the Arkle Trophy, the Tingle Greek Chase, the Hennessy Gold Cup, the EBF Novices Hurdle twice, the Hoechst Regumate Mares Novice Hurdle Final, twice, the Glenlivet Hurdle, the Seagram 100 Pipers Top Novice Chase, the Singer and Freidlander National Trial and the Reynoldstown Novices Chase, and the Sun Alliance Chase.

At the end of November 2014, Sherwood made quite an impact in horse racing.  Winning the Hennesy Gold Cup with Many Clouds was most significant – especially since the last time he had made that win was 24 years earlier. It was described as:  “the most raucous celebrations seen on this rather buttoned-up racetrack for many a year.”

Rhonehurst
Oliver Sherwood trains his horses at Rhonehurst. Offering stables for 60 horses, an equine swimming pool and more, today it is well-respected by top class National Hunt racing in the British Isles. He moved out of Rhonehurst in 2021, to rent Neardown Stables, Upper Lambourn. The yard is owned by successful ex-trainer Charlie Mann, who retired in 2021 with over 800 winners.

Education
Sherwood attended public school at Radley and confessed he was “hopeless academically.”

Personal data
Sherwood married Tarnya in 1993. They have a daughter and a son: Sabrina and Archie. Tarnya also had a love for horses, being a National Hunt jockey before meeting Oliver, riding winners as a professional under rules.  In 1989 she rode in the Grand National on Numerate, pulling up at the 21st fence.  He was previously married to Denise, daughter of Fred Winter. He enjoys playing cricket and was the Lambourn Xl Captain. He also supports the UK's Chelsea Football Team.

References

British racehorse trainers
1955 births
Living people
People educated at Radley College